Mae Ethel Klinck Myers (August 23, 1881 – May 24, 1960), better known as Ethel Myers, was a New York Realist artist and sculptor strongly influenced in her work by the goals of the Ashcan School and its leader and famous teacher, Robert Henri. Her earliest subjects for pictures involved her capturing the life of the Lower East Side as well as journeying to slums in other cities such as Boston. Her greatest fame came some years later, after her marriage to New York artist Jerome Myers, when she became known for her figurative bronze statuettes and figurines "with a quite uncommon sense of humor, and with more than this, a feeling for form and movement that gives them life and conviction." "Her three powerfully expressed sculptured figurines impress this reviewer with the fact that she is worthy of a place alongside of Daumier, Meunier and Mahonri Young."

Early life

Mae Ethel Klinck (first named Lillian Cochran) was born in Brooklyn, New York in 1881. Her 20-year-old mother was already seriously ill at the time of her birth and died when Ethel was 4 years old. Ethel's father was already dead and so she became an orphan. She was later adopted by Michael and Alfiata Klinck, an affluent couple who renamed her Mae Ethel Klinck. After the death of Michael Klinck, Alfiata moved between Brooklyn and Orange, N.J. which helped provide Ethel with a strong early education in both public and private schools. It was also her adoptive mother who encouraged Ethel to train on the piano in hopes of her becoming a concert pianist.

Ethel found her piano studies drudgery. "I decided I wanted to be a painter. I never had any other idea. So in my second year in the Newark high school I left and went to the National Academy in New York City, then on Twenty-Third Street. They sent me to Walter Satterlee, whose studio was in the old YMCA building across the street. After several months I took the examination at the Academy and failed. They sent word to me that if I would try again I would get in — but I said no — I have gone to the Chase School. There I became monitor of a class, and afterward became assistant director and teacher with John Douglas Connah, director. It was there that I was instrumental in getting Robert Henri in the school. It had then become the New York School of Art at Sixth Avenue and Fifty-Seventh Street."

Ethel studied at the Chase School (William Merritt Chase) and the New York School of Art from 1898 to 1904. A pet pupil of Chase, she also took the opportunity of studying with Henri, who would have a strong influence on her early art career. Among the others she attended classes with were Edward Hopper, Guy Pène du Bois, Gifford Beal, and Joseph Stella. She also became personally acquainted with the painters George Luks, John Sloan, William Glackens, Arthur B. Davies, Ernest Lawson and Elmer Livingston MacRae.

Early career, Ashcan School

The content of this article from The International Revue on Ethel (Klinck) Myers reveals how strongly she responded to the inspiration and goals that Robert Henri, as teacher, had set forth for his students.

  "An interesting study from the artist's viewpoint is being made by Miss M. Ethel Klinck of the life in our slums. Miss Klinck, who was a student in the Chase School of Art, is particularly attracted to the study of the manner of life of the foreign population of our large cities, which cling to their old world homogeneity. She spent much of the past year in the study of the Jewish district of this city, the general region bounded by Delancey and Hester Streets, and has some interesting sketches of the sights of the Norfolk Street Synagogue at the recent Day of Atonement. 
 
Last August she visited Boston and devoted herself to the Italian and Hebrew districts, particularly in the crowded region of Salem Street. More recently she has found the push-cart market, which the city has allowed, at and beyond the entrance to the new Williamsburg Bridge, a field of possibilities. It is not her custom to sketch upon the spot. This she finds, if it does not rouse antagonism and disinclination to be recorded by the artist's pencil, does at least result in an unnatural emphasis. The crowded life of the teeming slums must be taken off its guard, if at all, and the best method has proved to be that of carrying home sketches in the mind's eye merely.
 
Accordingly, Miss Klinck gathers her material by assuming the general costume of the people she wishes to observe and mixing with them as one engaged in their own pursuits. She is particularly inclined to make friends with the children and study their games. It is her intention to make what might be called a comparative study of the slums of different cities of the country. None of the large cities are without them, and her experience so far in New York and Boston has led her to look forward to extending her field. We reproduce here with a characteristic sketch."

Early work

Family life

Marriage
Ethel first met her future husband, artist Jerome Myers, in 1904.  After going to see Jerome's pictures at the Macbeth Gallery on a number of occasions, she started saving his newspaper clippings for a period of two years. His drawings and paintings of the lower East Side had been getting favorable reviews and he was widely respected by critics and artists alike, particularly Robert Henri, for the honesty and humanity of his realistic view of the immigrant populations crowded into that ghetto. It was Henri who had said,"Art cannot be separated from life...the artists who produce the most satisfactory art are in my mind those who are absorbed in the civilization in which they are living.""The poor were my people...through whom dignity of life is manifest."

Ethel arranged to meet Jerome Myers in his studio and afterwards they visited each other a number of times in their two studios, his on East 59th Street in New York City and hers in the old Connelly Mansion, built by Tammany Hall money, overlooking the Hudson River. "Marriage was the last thing in my mind," Ethel wrote, "but in three months Jerome proposed to me. He said he didn't have any money and maybe never would have, but if I would take a chance with him he would love to marry me. I looked at him in astonishment and said, But I am engaged to be married. He calmly said, Well, think it over for a week and let me know. He had never been to my house and knew nothing about me. I thought it over for a week and decided I would marry him."

Jerome Myers and Ethel Klinck were married in a small church ceremony in October 1905. They began marriage in his studio on 59th Street.

Disinheritance

Ethel's adoptive mother had already told her daughter she did not approve of her marriage to Jerome because he was a poor man and an artist, preferring Ethel's earlier engagement to a businessman. She subsequently cut Ethel off from the considerable inheritance that she had been promised.

Birth of daughter

A year after their marriage on October 21, 1906, Ethel gave birth to a daughter, Virginia Myers, after an extremely difficult labor.   Soon after the baby arrived, Ethel did receive a note from her adoptive mother, who it appears was still willing to have her daughter receive her full inheritance, even after disowning her because of the man she had married.  Her one condition was, "If I would leave Jerome and the baby and come back and live with her, she would give me everything. I never answered."

Folsom Show and Armory Show

Ethel soon made a career decision to move away from doing pictures of the Lower East Side and instead turned to an innovative approach in creating small, realistic sculptures. After the birth of her daughter, Ethel chose to give up painting in order to free up much-needed studio space for her artist husband. Her shift in medium also avoided the inevitable comparisons that would be made between the work of a married couple working in the same medium and similar subjects.

A figurative sculptor and art activist in New York City, Ethel Myers is known for her caricature bronzes of city people, many of them in humorous poses.   She exhibited nine of them in the 1913 Armory Show that introduced modernist art to America, and according to art historian Charlotte Rubinstein: "It is now clear that Myers was one of the most creative of the Americans who exhibited at the Armory Show." (169). However, she married painter Jerome Myers, and subjegated her career to his, which meant she did not receive her deserved recognition during her lifetime."

Critical appraisal (1912-1913)
The Craftsman:  “In the past Mrs. Myers has been better known to the artist world as a painter of courage and skill, for the future she must rank, whether she will or no, as a sculptor with the power of presenting through her work a knowledge of life and understanding of human psychology as rare as it is interesting.” 

The New York Times: "Mrs. Jerome Myers has an exhibition of sculptures at the Folsom Galleries that proves her a serious humorist, a Forain of Fifth Avenue."

The Brooklyn Eagle: "Ethel Myers in her three powerfully expressed sculptured figurines impress this reviewer with the fact that she is worthy of a place alongside of Daumier, Meunier and Mahonri Young."

New York Herald-Tribune: "Mrs. Myers' statuettes are many sketches of New York life, exceedingly plastic and full of expression."

Evening Mail, New York: "Mrs. Myers has an extraordinary graphic talent in her sculpture, and is doing a perfectly original and delightful thing."

New York Sun: "There is sculptural quality in these ingenious and clever little figures and the artist has said something worth while in her own amusing way. The little show is worthwhile seeing."

Vogue Magazine: "In her own field, Mrs. Myers' work is unique and charming."

Letter from Henry McBride to Ethel Myers - Jan. 24, 1913:  "Must congratulate you heartily on your little figures at the Folsom's. It's a case of good goods coming in small packages. I'm sending every one I know in to see them. Most charming things of the kind I've ever seen.

The Outlook Magazine quoting Theodore Roosevelt at the 1913 Armory Show:  "To name the pictures one would like to possess and the bronzes and tanagras and plasters would mean to make a catalogue of indefinite length. The little group called ‘Gossip’ by Ethel Myers is one which has something of the quality of the famous Fifteenth Idyl of Theocritus."  Just a few months before he visited the Armory Show, Roosevelt gave his annual address as President of the American Historical Association and included this observation, which may have prompted his reaction to Ethel Myers work on display at the Armory, "The inscriptions of Hellenistic Greece in the third century before our era do not, all told, give us so lifelike a view of the ordinary life of the ordinary men and women who dwelt in the great Hellenistic cities of the time, as does the fifteenth idyll of Theocritus."

Bronze statuettes

Career as publicist

Around 1909, when she was three years old, Ethel's daughter Virginia revealed herself to be possessed of strong artistic talent as well.  One day, as Ethel was playing the piano, she looked up to see Virginia naturally dancing to the rhythm and the emotional feeling of the music. This was a time when the impact of Isadora Duncan's dancing had totally captured the imagination of the artistic community of New York, as well as much of the rest of the world, and Ethel took note of Virginia's gift for spontaneous and instinctive movements.  She encouraged her daughter to perform, both privately and publicly.  Virginia starred in an Edison-produced film, Dream Dances of Virginia Myers, when she was five years old, doing 20 minutes of her own improvised solo dances as the first half of a "split-reeler."   The film was to spread her fame to all of America, far beyond the limits of just her acclaim in New York City.   In 1913, her talent was celebrated in an article in Vogue Magazine titled "When Virginia Dances," in which she was called "a child of the century."

What started out as private performances in the Myers small studio for friends and art collectors ("millionaires sitting in tears on ironing boards"), Virginia's performances soon demanded better and larger locations.  In spite of having limited financial resources to draw from, Ethel took on all management and organization of Virginia's blossoming career.  She organized a series of recitals throughout New York City, booking theatres, handling contracts, and coordinating costumes, set design, musicians, publicity, and the printing of tickets and programs.

As a result, Virginia became known as a "child wonder" of the dance, and people come from all over to see her, including the Parkhursts from England.  Ridgely Torrence and Percy MacKaye both wrote poetry about her." Over the years, Ethel and Jerome organized seventeen recitals in theaters in New York City with many articles written about Virginia's dancing genius.  When she was 16, the law at last permitted her to appear as a star dancing on the main stage at Carnegie Hall. Her first solo appearance there with orchestra was in April 1923, and the second in December of 1923.

1914

Consequences of the Armory Show
In spite of Ethel's personal success at the 1913 Armory show, and the enormous publicity surrounding all that took place, the event itself did not end up shining a spotlight on the work of American art and artists as Jerome Myers had originally hoped. Instead, the focus and reaction centered around the work of European modernists, and included 13 works by Gauguin, 19 by Cézanne, 8 by Picasso, 17 by Matisse, 18 by Van Gogh, as well as multiple works by Duchamp, Toulouse-Lautrec, Monet, Pissarro, Renoir, Daumier, Brâncuși, Rousseau and Degas.

Jerome had been working solidly for a year on planning and getting the American side of the show ready without being paid at all.  As Ethel said, "After the Armory show we were dead broke so I gave a studio exhibition of Jerome’s work, offered everything for half price because we were going to Europe." The reason was that she and Jerome, as well as many others in the New York art community knew that the impact of the Armory Show was going to have a very negative effect on the fate of many American artists when they tried to place their work with dealers. It would once again be European imports, or works influenced by them, that the dealers would be most interested in offering to their customers.

Journey to Europe and the start of WWI

Roger Fry, the English artist and writer and curator of paintings at the Metropolitan Museum of Art, had bought a number of Jerome's drawings for his private collection.  He urged Jerome to go to London, where Fry believed he would find a rich market for his work. Thus, the three members of the Myers family,  together with two steamer trunks filled with paintings and other art works, left for London in 1914.  The New York Times reported in their column, "What Well-Known New York Artists Are Doing These Hot Days," with this item: "Europe has lured Jerome Myers from his haunts in the metropolis, and this summer he will portray other character types in London, Paris, and other continental cities, which doubtless will be displayed in New York next season." The date was June 28, 1914.  One month later to the day would mark the start of the First World War.

After arriving in London to leave with their dealer some of the art they brought with them, the Myers family traveled directly to Paris, paid six months rent for a small apartment in the Left Bank, bought furniture for it, and moved in ready to start, hopefully, an exciting new chapter in their life. For a week or so it looked like things were going well with their life there and Jerome was already working. Also they had been making arrangements with a theater in Paris for their 8-year-old daughter. Virginia Myers, to do a solo evening of her own dances that had won critical acclaim in numerous New York performances. Unfortunately the outbreak of war shattered their plans.  The American Embassy strongly advised Jerome and Ethel to leave Paris at once.  They had no choice but to immediately pack up and abandon their leased apartment and the furniture they had bought for it. So with two taxi cabs packed with steamer trunks, unfinished paintings, wet laundry and almost no money, the Myers family set off on what was to be a frightening and exhausting journey to struggle their way back to America.

Return to America
Jerome, Ethel and their 8-year-old daughter, Virginia, were all in a state of exhaustion and near starvation due to the lack of food and the overcrowded wartime conditions they faced traveling all day and night on the deck of the ship taking them back to America. Their joy at the sight of the Statue of Liberty in New York harbor must have been not unlike the emotions felt by many earlier arriving immigrants, who later would become the subjects of so many of Jerome's Lower East Side pictures. Still for Jerome and Ethel their strong hope that going to Europe would allow for a change in their fortune turned out to be as much a failure as the turn in fortunes that Jerome believed the Armory Show would be in helping to create a far greater recognition of American artists.

It was about at this point, with things so difficult, that Ethel decided she really needed to help support her family by bringing in additional sources of new income. Her eyes turned toward the garment industry. It still didn't mean she would turn away from her art entirely. And it also didn't mean she had lost her sense of humor. As the Ashcan artist that she was, she found ever more ways to express herself as she observed the passing parade of New York life..

The characters in this comedy are taken from the passers-by and all the modern world is her stage.

Businesswoman, designer, educator
Ethel Myers believed strongly in the importance of her husband's artistic career, and never hesitated in putting her own artwork to the side to pursue entrepreneurial activities that would help her family weather economic difficulty.  These activities included design and teaching.  Her life as a businesswoman would cover a period of about 25 years, from 1915 until Jerome's death in 1940.

On her family's return to New York, Ethel recalled: "We lived in many places, some uptown, some downtown. Always making sketches and having exhibitions, but no home. Finally we took two rooms on West Thirty-Seventh Street in the Garment District, the top floor. The back studio hall room was Jerome’s studio and the third floor front hall room was where we three ate and slept. At this point I decided to be a designer of clothes. I took five dollars and bought lace and designed a blouse. Went up to the Fifth Avenue shop and sold the design. From then on I was in business." "The year before the Armory show. Jerome back in Carnegie. I took an apartment on East 58th Street. Went in business designing and had three girls. Worked for Fifth Avenue trade." "Mrs. Myers was a designer of women’s clothes and hats, maintaining a shop in New York City from 1920 to 1940 and designing clothes for noted celebrities of society, stage, and opera and for manufacturers."

Following her husband's death in 1940, Ethel devoted her time principally to furthering his artistic reputation. She lectured on Jerome's work throughout the United States, under the auspices of the American Federation of Art during 1941-43.  She also maintained the Jerome Myers Memorial Gallery in New York City for a number of years.

From 1949 until her retirement in 1959 she was Art Director of the Fine Arts and Ceramics Department at Christodora House in New York City.

References

External links

 
 American History Association - AHA Presidential Addresses, History as Literature by Theodore Roosevelt 1912

1881 births
1960 deaths
Students of Robert Henri
Artists from New York City
People from Brooklyn
Parsons School of Design alumni
20th-century American sculptors
20th-century American women artists
Sculptors from New York (state)